Moorswater is an industrial suburb of Liskeard in Cornwall, England, United Kingdom. It is situated approximately half-a-mile (0.8 km) west of Liskeard town centre.

Moorswater has a long industrial history and lies south of the former mining area around Kit Hill and Caradon Hill at the southeast edge of Bodmin Moor. Moorswater was at the southern end of one of Cornwall's early railways, the Liskeard and Caradon Railway mineral line which opened in 1844.

Moorswater lies in a valley which is spanned by Moorswater viaduct carrying the Cornish Main Line railway. The single-track Looe Valley Line branches from the main line at Liskeard railway station and descends into the valley allowing freights trains to access Moorswater Industrial Estate on the site of the former Moorswater railway station, once the centre of operations for the Liskeard and Caradon Railway.

The former china clay works at Moorswater is now a rail-served cement terminal.

See also

 Moorswater viaduct
 Liskeard and Caradon Railway
 Moorswater railway station
 Liskeard and Caradon Railway
 Liskeard railway station

References

Villages in Cornwall